"Let Me Play With Your Poodle" is a 1942 hokum blues song by the American blues musician Tampa Red. His recording reached #4 on the Billboard "Harlem Hit Parade" in March 1943, after first hitting the chart in December 1942, and the song has been recorded many times since by other artists.

Other notable recordings
 Bonnie Davis and the Piccadilly Pipers (1946)
 Hank Penny (1947)
 Lightnin' Hopkins (1947)
 Luke "Long Gone" Miles (with George "Harmonica" Smith) (1962)
 Piano Red (1977, on an album of the same name)
 CeDell Davis (1982, on the compilation album Living Country Blues USA Vol. 5 - Mississippi Delta Blues)
 Dana Gillespie (1982, on the album Blue Job)
 James Cotton (1996, on the Grammy-winning album Deep in the Blues)
 Marcia Ball (1997, on her album Let Me Play With Your Poodle)
 Duke Robillard Band (2011)
 Mark Hummel (2020, on his album Wayback Machine)

References

Tampa Red songs
1942 songs
Hokum blues songs